WrestleMania VII was the seventh annual WrestleMania professional wrestling pay-per-view (PPV) event produced by the World Wrestling Federation (WWF, now WWE). It took place on March 24, 1991, at the Los Angeles Memorial Sports Arena in Los Angeles, California in the United States. Fourteen matches were shown during the live broadcast, with one dark match held before the event.

The main event saw Hulk Hogan defeat Sgt. Slaughter for the WWF Championship as part of a storyline in which Sgt. Slaughter portrayed an Iraqi sympathizer during the United States' involvement in the Gulf War. Significant events on the undercard included The Undertaker's WrestleMania debut and the beginning of his renowned winning streak, a retirement match between Randy Savage and The Ultimate Warrior leading to the former's reuniting with estranged love Miss Elizabeth, as well as the final televised match of the original Hart Foundation, after which Bret Hart became primarily a singles wrestler.

Production

Background
WrestleMania is considered the World Wrestling Federation's (WWF, now WWE) flagship pay-per-view (PPV) event, having first been held in 1985. It is held annually between mid-March to mid-April. It was the first of the WWF's original four pay-per-views, which includes Royal Rumble, SummerSlam, and Survivor Series, which were eventually dubbed the "Big Four". WrestleMania VII was originally scheduled to be held on March 24, 1991, in Los Angeles, California at the Los Angeles Memorial Coliseum, but the WWF decided to move the event to the adjacent Los Angeles Memorial Sports Arena.

The WWF's stated reason for the venue change was that it had security concerns in the wake of Sgt. Slaughter's portrayal of an Iraqi sympathizer during the Gulf War. This was dismissed by outlets such as SLAM! Sports of Canada, who chalked up the venue change to poor advanced ticket sales, and the company having difficulty filling the estimated 100,000 seats available. According to former WWF executive Bruce Prichard, both were accurate statements. In his Something to Wrestle With podcast, Prichard said that even if the WWF had sold out the Coliseum, the scope of the event was too large for police to ensure its security. Prichard explained further in an interview with Kayfabe Commentaries that the WWF would have had to foot the entire bill for the amount of security necessary to keep the wrestlers and fans safe from all potential issues, citing both the possibility of an outside attack and the crime rate of the surrounding neighborhood. Dave Meltzer in the Wrestling Observer Newsletter wrote that between 11,900 and 15,000 tickets were sold before the move. He also reported that no tickets had to be refunded, indicating that sales were under 15,500. Comp tickets were believed to help fill the show's crowd.

The tagline for the event was "Superstars and Stripes Forever," and is remembered for its theme of American patriotism in the wake of the Gulf War. American flags were hung all over the arena and the ring apron and banners were colored red, white, and blue, which was the basis for the main event between Hulk Hogan and Sgt. Slaughter for the WWF World Heavyweight Championship.

This was the first WrestleMania not to feature Jesse "The Body" Ventura as a color commentator. Gorilla Monsoon hosted the event with  Bobby Heenan. When Heenan had to manage at ringside in the opening match and again during Mr. Perfect's Intercontinental Heavyweight Championship defense, Monsoon was joined on the commentary by Jim Duggan and "Lord" Alfred Hayes respectively. In addition, Regis Philbin helped with commentary on the main event while Jeopardy! host Alex Trebek served as the ring announcer.

Willie Nelson sang a rendition of "America the Beautiful" before the show. Other celebrity guests in attendance for WrestleMania VII included Philbin, Trebek, and Marla Maples as backstage announcers. George Steinbrenner, Paul Maguire, Macaulay Culkin, Donald Trump, Lou Ferrigno, Chuck Norris, Beverly D'Angelo and Henry Winkler appeared as spectators. Bob Costas was scheduled to make an appearance, but he canceled weeks before the event due to his objection to the main event angle.

The artist for the promotional poster is renowned illustrative painter Joe Jusko known mainly for his work within the comic book industry.

Randy Savage required surgery on a broken thumb in late January before the event. The injury required him to miss several matches leading up to WrestleMania.

Storylines
The two main feuds entering WrestleMania in 1991 were between Hulk Hogan and WWF Champion  Sgt. Slaughter and The Ultimate Warrior and "Macho King" Randy Savage, and in a way, both were intertwined.

Warrior had defeated Hogan for the WWF Championship at WrestleMania a year earlier and entered 1991 as the champion. In the meantime, Sgt. Slaughter had returned to the WWF near the end of 1990 after spending five years wrestling in the American Wrestling Association. When he returned, Slaughter announced that he had turned his back on his country and had become an Iraqi sympathizer and follower of Saddam Hussein. He had also revealed an alliance with an Iraqi military leader, General Adnan, who became his advisor (Adnan having followed Slaughter from the AWA to participate in the angle). This coincided with the increasing tension in the Middle East that was going on at that time, which eventually would lead to Operation Desert Storm and American involvement in the conflict. Slaughter would eventually set his sights on the Warrior, and the two agreed to a match at the Royal Rumble in January 1991.

Savage, meanwhile, was trying to regain the WWF Championship that he had lost at WrestleMania V to Hogan and challenged Warrior repeatedly to give him a shot. Warrior continually refused to do so and Savage decided to seek another remedy. During the match between Warrior and Slaughter, Savage and his manager Queen Sherri came to ringside and got involved in the match. Warrior picked up an interfering Sherri and tossed her from the ring onto Savage. Slaughter capitalized by driving Warrior down, leaving him hanging over the second rope. Savage then struck Warrior with his royal scepter as Slaughter kept the referee's attention, knocking the champion unconscious. Slaughter then hit an elbow drop on the Warrior and pinned him to become the new champion. After he came to and realized what Savage had done, Warrior charged to the back looking for Savage. He then issued a challenge for a retirement match for the two at WrestleMania, which Savage accepted.

Hogan, having no connection with the ongoing story to this point, entered the Royal Rumble match as its defending champion. He won the match by eliminating his old rival Earthquake last, then went backstage to be interviewed by Gene Okerlund. During the course of the interview, the word was relayed to the two that Slaughter and Adnan were celebrating their triumph by defacing an American flag. Hogan then promised to stand up for his country and take the title from Slaughter as soon as possible, and was later named the #1 contender for the WWF Championship, which he had not contended for since losing the title to the Warrior at WrestleMania VI.

Leading up to the show, Hogan continued to cite the ongoing real-life war in their feud. On one episode of WWF Prime Time Wrestling, Hogan stated that Iraq would surrender in the war at the moment he defeated Slaughter.

Event

The opening bout was a singles match pitting the Brooklyn Brawler against Koko B. Ware. Ware defeated the Brooklyn Brawler by pinfall. This was a dark match that did not air on the pay-per-view broadcast.

The pay-per-view broadcast began with a performance of "America the Beautiful" by Willie Nelson.

The second bout, and the first bout to air on the pay-per-view broadcast, was a tag team match pitting the Barbarian and Haku against the Rockers. The Rockers won the bout when Shawn Michaels pinned Haku with a flying bodypress.

The third bout was a singles match between Dino Bravo and the Texas Tornado. The Texas Tornado won the bout by pinfall following a discus punch.

The fourth bout was a singles match between the British Bulldog and the Warlord. The British Bulldog won the bout by pinfall following a running powerslam.

The fifth bout was a tag team match in which WWF Tag Team Champions the Hart Foundation defended their titles against the Nasty Boys. The Nasty Boys defeated the Hart Foundation to win their first WWF Tag Team Championship when Jerry Sags struck Jim Neidhart with a motorcycle helmet, enabling Brian Knobbs to pin him.

The sixth bout was a blindfold match between Jake Roberts and Rick Martel. Roberts won the bout by pinfall following a DDT.

The seventh bout was a singles match between Jimmy Snuka and The Undertaker. The Undertaker won the bout by pinfall following a Tombstone Piledriver.

The eighth bout was a retirement match between Randy Savage and the Ultimate Warrior. During the match between Savage and the Warrior, Savage's estranged valet Miss Elizabeth was spotted in the crowd. During the course of the match, cameras kept cutting to her as she grew concerned for Savage's wellbeing. Despite taking five of Savage's diving elbow drops, Warrior won the match after hitting the Macho King with three jumping shoulder blocks and forced Savage to retire. After the match, Sherri came into the ring and attacked Savage, which prompted Elizabeth to charge into the ring and fight off the former Queen and save Savage. Shocked to see what Elizabeth had done for him, Savage had an emotional reunion with his former manager and held the ring ropes open for her so she could exit, turning Savage into a face for the first time in over two years.

The ninth bout was a tag team match pitting Demolition against Genichiro Tenryu and Kōji Kitao. Tenryu and Kitao won the bout when Tenryu pinned Smash following a powerbomb.

The tenth bout was a singles match between in which WWF Intercontinental Champion Mr. Perfect defended his title against Big Boss Man. Big Boss Man won the bout by disqualification after the Barbarian and Haku attacked him, meaning Hennig retained his title.

The eleventh bout was a singles match between Earthquake and Greg Valentine. Earthquake won a short squash match by pinfall following an Earthquake Splash.

The twelfth bout was a tag team match pitting the Legion of Doom against Power and Glory. The Legion of Doom won a short squash match when Animal pinned Paul Roma following a doomsday device.

The thirteenth bout was a singles match between Ted DiBiase and Virgil. Virgil won the bout by countout after Roddy Piper caused DiBiase to fall out of the ring and he was unable to re-enter in time.

The fourteenth bout was a singles match between The Mountie and Tito Santana. The Mountie won the bout by pinfall after electrocuting Santana with his cattle prod.

The main event saw WWF Champion Sgt. Slaughter defend his title against Hulk Hogan. Hogan defeated Slaughter by pinfall following a leg drop to win his third WWF Championship.

Reception
The official attendance of WrestleMania VII held at the Los Angeles Memorial Sports Arena was 16,158. Journalist Dave Meltzer reported that the paid attendance was approximately 10,500.

Aftermath
The Undertaker's victory debut at the event marked the beginning of his undefeated WrestleMania streak. 

Backstage as Hogan was being interviewed on his victory over Sgt. Slaughter, Slaughter attacked Hogan by throwing a fireball in his face. Hogan quickly recovered from the attack and defended the belt primarily against Slaughter, largely in "Desert Storm" (i.e., no-disqualification) matches. He also had to deal with the returning Iron Sheik, who was now competing as Colonel Mustafa. Hogan and the Ultimate Warrior eventually teamed up at SummerSlam 1991, defeating Slaughter, Mustafa, and their manager, General Adnan, in a two-vs.-three handicap match.

Savage returned to television in a non-wrestling role as a color commentator for the WWF's flagship syndicated program, Superstars; although a fan favorite to the crowd, much of his commentary was heel-leaning. Meanwhile, the storyline with Miss Elizabeth continued, culminating with Savage proposing to her in the ring leading to an on-air wedding at SummerSlam 1991 dubbed The Match Made in Heaven. (The wedding was kayfabe, as Savage and Elizabeth were already legally married.)

Virgil and Ted DiBiase feuded with each other until November 1991, including facing off at SummerSlam 1991 when DiBiase lost his Million Dollar Belt to Virgil. After DiBiase won his belt back in November with the help of The Repo Man (formerly Smash of Demolition), their feud ended at the This Tuesday in Texas PPV when DiBiase and Repo Man defeated Virgil and Tito Santana in a tag team match.

Genichiro Tenryu and Kōji Kitao were on loan from the Japanese promotion Super World of Sports. The WWF co-promoted several cards in Japan with the group, including two Tokyo Dome shows on March 30 and December 12, 1991. Although SWS folded in June 1992, Tenryu's follow-up promotion, WAR, co-promoted the WWF's first Japanese tour in 1994.

After WrestleMania VII, The Hart Foundation disbanded. Bret Hart and Jim Neidhart went into singles competition. Bret Hart went on to singles success, defeating Mr. Perfect for the WWF Intercontinental Heavyweight Championship at SummerSlam 1991, and later in 1992 would win the WWF Championship when he defeated Ric Flair in his father's home town of Saskatoon in Saskatchewan, Canada. Neidhart would later in 1991 form a tag team called "The New Foundation" with Hart's younger brother Owen. 

This would be the final WrestleMania appearance for André the Giant. André would appear at ringside during the Intercontinental Championship match and assist the Big Boss Man in fending off the Heenan Family. He would make sporadic appearances for the rest of the year before his passing in 1993.

Results

References

External links 
 
 

WrestleMania
Professional wrestling in Los Angeles
1991 in Los Angeles
1991 WWF pay-per-view events
Events in Los Angeles
March 1991 events in the United States